Gordon Balser (born February 24, 1954) is a former educator and politician in Nova Scotia, Canada. He represented Digby-Annapolis in the Nova Scotia House of Assembly from 1998 to 2003 as a Progressive Conservative member.

Early life
He was born in Digby, Nova Scotia, the son of George Balser and Seddie Crosby, and was educated at Acadia University.

Balser was a teacher, teaching principal and acting superintendent of schools for the Digby district.

Political career
Balser entered provincial politics in the 1998 election, defeating Liberal John Drish by 233 votes in the Digby-Annapolis riding. He was re-elected in the 1999 election by over 2,200 votes. In August 1999, he was appointed to the Executive Council of Nova Scotia as Minister of Economic Development and Minister of Transportation and Public Works. In December 1999, the Transportation and Public Works portfolio was transferred to Ron Russell. In June 2002, Balser was shuffled to Minister of Energy. On December 19, 2002, premier John Hamm shuffled his cabinet, moving Balser to Minister of Agriculture and Fisheries, and Minister of the Public Service Commission. In the 2003 election, Balser was defeated by Liberal Harold Theriault.

Personal life
In 1981, he married Wendy Suzanne Moore. His daughter Jill Balser was elected to the legislature to represent Digby-Annapolis in the 2021 Nova Scotia general election.

References 
 Lumley, E Canadian Who's Who 2003 

1954 births
Acadia University alumni
Living people
Members of the Executive Council of Nova Scotia
People from Digby County, Nova Scotia
Progressive Conservative Association of Nova Scotia MLAs
21st-century Canadian politicians